Trần Quốc Vượng may refer to:
Trần Quốc Vượng (historian)
Trần Quốc Vượng (politician)